Teófilo Juan Cubillas Arizaga (born 8 March 1949) is a Peruvian former footballer who played as an attacking midfielder. He was selected as Peru's greatest ever player in an IFFHS poll, in which he was also included in the world's Top 50. He was renowned for his technique, shooting ability and free kick ability.

Nicknamed El Nene (The Kid), he was part of the Peru national team that won the 1975 Copa América. He helped Peru reach the quarter finals at the 1970 FIFA World Cup and again at the 1978 World Cup and was elected the South American Footballer of the Year in 1972.

In 2004, Pelé selected Cubillas as one of the FIFA 100, a list of 125 footballing greats. In February 2008, to celebrate the 50th anniversary of the first Brazilian World Cup victory, he was selected in the All-Star First Team of South America of the past 50 years. Cubillas is one of only three players to score five or more goals in two different World Cups, the other two being Miroslav Klose and Thomas Müller.

Club career
Nicknamed "Nene" (the babe) for his boyish looks, Cubillas began his career with Alianza Lima at the age of 16 in 1966. Whilst at Alianza he was top scorer in the Peruvian Primera División in 1966 and 1970.

In 1972, he had his most successful season in several years. He was Libertadores Cup top scorer and South American Footballer of the Year.

In the summer of 1973, Cubillas transferred to Swiss football club FC Basel under head coach Helmut Benthaus. The Basler entrepreneur and transport company owner Ruedi Reisdorfer paid the transfer fee of £97,000. After playing in four Cup of the Alps games, Cubillas played his domestic league debut for his new club on 18 August in the away game against Chênois. He scored his first goal for the club in the same game as Basel won 1–0. Cubillas scored two goals for Basel in the 1973–74 European Cup, the first of which in the 1st leg against Fram on 19 September 1973 and the second in the return leg on 20 September. He only remained at the club for six months, which was not long enough for him to show the extent of his talent. In these six months Cubillas played a total of 21 games for Basel scoring a total of eight goals.10 of these games were in the Nationalliga A, two in the Swiss Cup, four in the European Cup, four in the Cup of the Alps and one was a friendly game. He scored three goals in the league, two in the domestic cup, two in the European Cup and the other one was scored in the Cup of the Alps.

Later on, for the second half of the 1973–74 season he joined Portuguese club FC Porto for a fee of £200,000. In 1977, he returned to Alianza Lima.

In 1979, Cubillas joined the NASL, signing for Fort Lauderdale Strikers, where he spent five seasons, scoring 59 league goals, including three goals in seven minutes against the Los Angeles Aztecs in 1981.

Following the December 1987 Alianza Lima air crash Cubillas returned from his Miami home to play for free for Alianza, who lost most of their players in the crash. He also managed the club for a period in 1988.

In May 1988 Cubillas signed with the newly resurrected Fort Lauderdale Strikers of the American Soccer League. The Strikers went to the ASL title game where they fell to the Washington Diplomats. Following the loss to the Diplomats, the Strikers released Cubillas.

In March 1989, he signed with the Miami Sharks but was released on 3 July after scoring only one goal in eight games. As of June 1991 he was playing and coaching at Miramar Illusiones of the Gold Coast Soccer League in Florida.

International career 
Cubillas played in three World Cups between 1970 and 1982.

1970 World Cup 

Cubillas helped the Peru national team advance to the quarter-finals of the 1970 FIFA World Cup in Mexico. He scored in all of Peru's four matches: once against Bulgaria, twice against Morocco, and once against West Germany, all in the first round. Cubillas then scored another goal in the quarter-final loss against eventual champions Brazil, and he thus finished as the third highest goal scorer in the tournament.

He won the FIFA World Cup Young Player Award, and was third in the Golden Shoe award.

1975 Copa America
The Peru national team did not qualify for the 1974 FIFA World Cup in West Germany, but a year later, Cubillas helped Peru win its second South American title, the Copa América 1975. Cubillas scored against Brazil in the semi-final, and then played in the play-off match in the final.

1978 World Cup
In the 1978 FIFA World Cup in Argentina, Cubillas scored five goals for Peru, finishing co-second highest goal scorer after Mario Kempes. Peru advanced to the second phase of the tournament thanks to goals from Cubillas: he scored two goals in the opening match against Scotland (one of which was an excellent free-kick), and he then scored a hat-trick in the game against Iran, including two penalties.

However, Peru subsequently lost to Brazil, Poland and Argentina, although Cubillas played in all six Peru matches in the tournament.

1982 World Cup
Cubillas was also in the Peru national team for 1982 FIFA World Cup. He played in all three group games but did not score any goals.

Career statistics

Club

International
Scores and results list Peru's goal tally first, score column indicates score after each Cubillas goal.

Honours
Porto
Taça de Portugal: 1976–77

Alianza Lima
Peruvian Primera División: 1977, 1978

Fort Lauderdale Sun
United Soccer League: 1984, 1985

Peru
Copa América: 1975

Individual
Peruvian Primera División top scorer: 1966, 1970
FIFA World Cup Best Young Player: 1970
FIFA World Cup Bronze Boot: 1970
Copa Libertadores top scorer: 1972
South American Footballer of the Year: 1972
CONMEBOL All-Star Team: 1973
Copa America Best Player: 1975
FIFA World Cup Silver Boot: 1978
FIFA World Cup All-Star Team: 1978
NASL All-Star teams, all-time: 1980, 1981
NASL Best Midfield: 1981
Fort Lauderdale Strikers top scorer, all time: 1984
France Football: World Cup top 100 1930–1990: 2000
World Soccer The 100 Greatest Footballers of All Time: 2000
Placar The 100 Players of the Century: 2000
Placar The 100 Players FIFA World Cup: 2000
FIFA 100: 2004
IFFHS' Best Players of the Century for Peru: 2006
World – Player of the Century Nº 48: 2006
South American – Player of the Century Nº 17: 2006
The Best of The Best – Player of the Century Top 50: 2007
CONMEBOL All-Star first team 1958–2008: 2008
Peru national team all-time scoring leader: 2008

References

External links

 CubillasInc.com and Nene Cubillas Camp Futbol – Official Website
 NASL stats

1949 births
Living people
Footballers from Lima
FIFA 100
Peru international footballers
Club Alianza Lima footballers
American Soccer League (1988–89) players
FC Basel players
FC Porto players
Fort Lauderdale Strikers (1988–1994) players
Fort Lauderdale Strikers (1977–1983) players
Fort Lauderdale Sun players
Miami Freedom players
North American Soccer League (1968–1984) indoor players
North American Soccer League (1968–1984) players
United Soccer League (1984–85) players
Primeira Liga players
Peruvian Primera División players
1970 FIFA World Cup players
1978 FIFA World Cup players
1982 FIFA World Cup players
1975 Copa América players
Expatriate footballers in Switzerland
Peruvian expatriate sportspeople in Switzerland
Expatriate footballers in Portugal
Peruvian expatriate sportspeople in Portugal
Expatriate soccer players in the United States
Peruvian expatriate sportspeople in the United States
South American Footballer of the Year winners
Copa América-winning players
Peruvian footballers
Association football midfielders
Swiss Super League players
Peruvian people of African descent